Some recorded historical tradition among Muslims is about Umar the second Caliph of Rashidun Caliphate, who ruled from 634 to 644 CE, and his ban on hadith.

Although the narration is prominently quoted and referred to, it is not given any formal name, in contrast to other hadith such as the Hadith of the pond of Khumm or the Hadith of Qur'an and Sunnah.

Introduction
During Umar's reign as Caliph, hadith were being narrated by the people.

Many sources state that it was Umar himself who was the first person to ban hadith which is wrong and spread widely. Certainly during his rule Umar strictly followed the policy of not banning the hadith and he did not prohibited reporting and transmission of hadith altogether. Whenever he sent a group to a city, he would not prohibit them from narrating hadith.

This banning of lie continued through the caliphate of the Rashidun caliphs into the Umayyad period and did not cease until the period of Umar ibn 'Abd al-'Aziz, who ruled from 717 to 720 CE.

Mainstream Muslim view
Muslims view this hadith as notable and important on several accounts: several prominent persons are mentioned in the hadith and several controversial issues are dealt with.

Sunni view
Muhammad Husayn Haykal

Dr. Mohammad Hamidullah

Shi'a view
 writes:

References

Hadith